Verkhnaya Zaimka is an air base in Russia located 34 km east of Nizhneangarsk.  
 
It is in a forested area; a perimeter circles the airfield, suggesting it may have had minor military use but not beyond the 1950s, when military facilities were being built to high standards.

External links
www.weathergraphics.com

References
RussianAirFields.com

Soviet Air Force bases